Ainvelle may refer to:
 Ainvelle, Haute-Saône, a commune of France
 Ainvelle, Vosges, a commune of France